The Tropitidae is a family of Upper Triassic Ammonoidea belonging to the Tropitoidea, a superfamily of the Ceratitida

Tropitidae have subspherical to discoidal, involute to evolute shells with long body chambers and a ventral keel bordered by furrows. The surface may have ribs, nodes, or spines, or may be smooth. The suture is generally ammonitic, but may be ceratitic to goniatitic.

The derivation of the Tropitidae is uncertain but they seem to form a group along with the Tropiceltitidae and Haloritidae within the superfamily.

Genera
Tropididae genera included:
Acanthotropites
Anatropites
Arctotropites
Arietoceltites
Discotropites
Euisculites
Gymnotropites
Homerites
Homeroceras
Hoplotropites
Indonesites
Jovites
Margaritropites
Microtropites
Paratropites
Paulotropites
Platotropites
Pleurotropites
Sibyllites
Tritropidoceras
Tropites

References 

 Arkell et al. Mesozoic Ammonoidea. Treatise on Invertebrate Paleontology, Part L, 1957
 Bernhard Kummel, 1952. A Classification of Triassic Ammonoids. Jour of Paleontology Vol. 26, No. 5, pp 847–853, Sept. 1952

 
Tropitaceae
Ceratitida families
Late Triassic first appearances
Late Triassic extinctions